Klara Hallik (born 24 April 1933 in Leningrad Oblast) is an Estonian politician and political scientist. In 1992, she was Minister of National Relations. In 2001, she took part in the public appeal "Two Estates" by Estonian social scientists concerned about the development of Estonian society.

References

Living people
1933 births
Women government ministers of Estonia
Members of the Supreme Soviet of the Soviet Union
20th-century Estonian women politicians